Jon McShane (born 14 September 1991) is a Scottish professional football who most recently played for Stenhousemuir. He previously played for St Mirren, Dumbarton, Hamilton Academical, Celtic Nation, East Fife and Stranraer. He now resides in Australia and currently plays for Dandenong City SC.

Career
Born in Paisley, McShane began his career with St Mirren and came through the youth system from the age of 12. McShane spent the 2010–11 season on loan at Dumbarton where he scored 13 goals in 29 games before returning to St Mirren for the 2011–2012 season. McShane joined Hamilton Academical on loan in January 2012. After he returned to St Mirren a permanent deal was agreed for McShane to join Hamilton Academical for an undisclosed fee.

On 25 January 2014, McShane was released by Hamilton Academical. On 28 March 2014, he signed for Celtic Nation of the Northern League Division One.

On 23 May 2014, McShane signed for East Fife and then on 9 January 2015, moved on loan to Stranraer until June 2015.

In 2016, McShane moved to Australia, signing for Altona Magic SC in the Victorian State League Division 1, the fourth tier of Australian soccer league system. McShane scored 17 goals in 21 games in his first season in Australia, the second highest tally in the league as his side won the championship. The following season, McShane scored 12 goals in 21 games as his side claimed back-to-back State League 1 championships, this time, with the league system opened up, helping his side achieve promotion to the National Premier Leagues Victoria 2 where he has signed for Altona Magic leading his team to consecutive titles and promotion to the top tier of Victorian football scoring 31 goals thus far.. In the NPL2, Magic made it three consecutive league titles and achieved promotion to the top tier of football in Victoria, with McShane grabbing 17 goals in 27 games, the highest in the NPL2 West conferences and second highest in the NPL2 overall, with only Apai Ukuno scoring more (18).

Career statistics

A.  The "Other" column constitutes appearances (including substitutes) and goals in the Scottish Challenge Cup.

References

External links
 

1991 births
Living people
Footballers from Paisley, Renfrewshire
Scottish footballers
St Mirren F.C. players
Dumbarton F.C. players
Hamilton Academical F.C. players
Celtic Nation F.C. players
East Fife F.C. players
Stranraer F.C. players
Scottish Premier League players
Scottish Football League players
Association football forwards
Scottish Professional Football League players
Stenhousemuir F.C. players
Altona Magic SC players